Michael B. Jandreau (October 20, 1943 – April 3, 2015) was a Native American leader.

Background
Born in Fort Thompson, South Dakota, to  Leo (Tete) Burdette Jandreau and Dorothy Belva (Langdeau) Jandreau Jones, Jandreau was the chairman of the Lower Brule Sioux Tribe now centered on the Lower Brule Sioux-Lakota Reservation, one of several tribal governments in South Dakota. He was a leader on the reservation, and served as the chief executive officer of the Tribe. He began in 1972 as Vice Chairman, at which time the Tribal Council elected the officers of the council from its members. In 1986, Jandreau was elected as the first Tribal Council Chairman to be elected at large for the Lower Brule Sioux-Lakota Tribe.

He started many of the tribe's projects, including the Lower Brule Wildlife Program and the Golden Buffalo Casino. Jandreau died on April 3, 2015, in Sioux Falls, South Dakota.

Service on Lower Brule Sioux Tribal Council

Service on Regional and National Boards & Committees

Testimony Before Congress

Fiscal Accountability
Under Chairman Jandreau's leadership, the Lower Brule Sioux Tribe was among the most timely of tribes in the Northern Great Plains' Region to file Single Audit reports each fiscal year.  The opinions of audit firms for Fiscal Years 1997 through 2013 generally reflected the Tribe's commitment to strong internal controls and to following its fiscal policies and procedures. The Lower Brule Sioux Tribe received Unqualified (Unmodified) audit reports for twelve of these seventeen audit years, and Qualified (Modified) audit reports for the other five years. Moreover, with regard to Major Program Compliance, the Tribe was only issued Qualified (Modified) opinions two out of the seventeen aforementioned fiscal years. Copies of the Lower Brule Sioux Tribe's Single Audit Reports for FY1997 thru FY2013 are freely available on the Federal Audit Clearinghouse website (https://web.archive.org/web/20000619103409/http://harvester.census.gov/).

References

External links
 Lower Brule Tribe home page

Brulé people
People from Buffalo County, South Dakota
South Dakota politicians
1943 births
2015 deaths
Native American Roman Catholics